The 1959–60 Danish Ice Hockey Championship season was the third season of ice hockey in Denmark. Three teams participated in the final tournament, and KSF Copenhagen won the championship.

Jütland Regional Tournament
Teams
Silkeborg SF
Rungsted IK

Silkeborg SF qualified for the final tournament.

Final tournament

Semifinal
Rungsted IK - Silkeborg SF 17:1

Final
KSF Copenhagen - Rungsted IK 6:5

References
 Michael Søvsø: Fra pionerånd til verdensklasse - Danmarks Ishockey Union i 60 år (2009)

External links
Season on eliteprospects.com

Danish
1959 in Danish sport
1960 in Danish sport